Phryneta is a genus of flat-faced longhorn beetles belonging to the family Cerambycidae.

Species
 Phryneta asmarensis Breuning, 1969
 Phryneta atricornis Fairmaire, 1893
 Phryneta aurivillii Hintz, 1913
 Phryneta aurocincta (Guérin-Méneville, 1832)
 Phryneta bulbifera (Kolbe, 1894)
 Phryneta coeca Chevrolat, 1857
 Phryneta conradti Kolbe, 1894
 Phryneta crassa Jordan, 1903
 Phryneta densepilosa Breuning, 1973
 Phryneta ellioti (Gahan, 1909)
 Phryneta elobeyana Báguena, 1952
 Phryneta ephippiata (Pascoe, 1864)
 Phryneta escalerai Báguena & Breuning, 1958
 Phryneta flavescens Breuning, 1954
 Phryneta hecphora Thomson, 1857
 Phryneta histrix Hintz, 1913
 Phryneta immaculata Hintz, 1911
 Phryneta leprosa (Fabricius, 1775) - Castilloa Borer
 Phryneta luctuosa (Murray, 1870)
 Phryneta macularis Harold, 1879
 Phryneta marmorea (Olivier, 1792)
 Phryneta obesa (Westwood, 1845)
 Phryneta obliquata (Harold, 1878)
 Phryneta pallida Thomson, 1857
 Phryneta pulchra Tippmann, 1958
 Phryneta rufa Breuning, 1954
 Phryneta semirasa Dohrn, 1885
 Phryneta silacea Aurivillius, 1907
 Phryneta spinator (Fabricius, 1792) - Fig-tree Borer Longhorn Beetle
 Phryneta verrucosa (Drury, 1773)

References
 Biolib
 Worldwide Cerambycoidea Photo Gallery

Phrynetini